Kavindu Ranasinghe (born 19 February 2001) is a Sri Lankan cricketer. He made his Twenty20 debut on 14 March 2021, for Colombo Cricket Club in the 2020–21 SLC Twenty20 Tournament.

References

External links
 

2001 births
Living people
Sri Lankan cricketers
Colombo Cricket Club cricketers
Place of birth missing (living people)